The 1953 World Table Tennis Championships women's doubles was the 19th edition of the women's doubles championship.
Gizi Farkas and Angelica Rozeanu defeated Diane Rowe and Rosalind Rowe in the final by three sets to one.

Results

See also
List of World Table Tennis Championships medalists

References

-
1953 in women's table tennis